Cava is a rural municipality in the comarca of Alt Urgell, Lleida, Catalonia, Spain. The population of 50 people were scattered into three little villages (Cava, Ansovell and el Querforadat)

References

External links
 Government data pages 

Municipalities in Alt Urgell